Echoencephalography is the detailing of interfaces in the brain by means of ultrasonic waves.

See also
Electroencephalography (EEG)
Magnetoencephalography (MEG)
Tomography
Medical ultrasonography
Echocardiography, magnetocardiography (MCG), and electrocardiography (ECG or EKG), for diagnosing heart problems

References

Medical ultrasonography